The Maquoketa Formation is a geologic formation in Illinois, Indiana. Iowa, Kansas, Minnesota, Missouri, and Wisconsin. It preserves mollusk, coral, brachiopod and graptolite fossils dating back to the Darriwilian to Hirnantian stages (Edenian to Richmondian in the regional stratigraphy) of the Ordovician period.

References

Further reading 
 T. J. Frest, C. E. Brett, and B. J. Witzke. 1999. Caradocian-Gedinnian echinoderm associations of Central and Eastern North America. Paleocommunities--a case study from the Silurian and Lower Devonian 638-783
 R. J. Elias and D. Lee. 1993. Microborings and growth in Late Ordovician halysitids and other corals. Journal of Paleontology 67(6):922-934
 J. A. Catalani. 1987. Biostratigraphy of the Middle and Late Ordovician cephalopods of the Upper Mississippi Valley area. In R. E. Sloan (ed.), Middle and Late Ordovician lithostratigraphy and biostratigraphy of the Upper Mississippi Valley: Minnesota Geological Survey Report of Investigations 35 187-189
 J. Pojeta, Jr. 1987. Ordovician pelecypods from the Upper Mississippi Valley. In R. E. Sloan (ed.), Middle and Late Ordovician lithostratigraphy and biostratigraphy of the Upper Mississippi Valley: Minnesota Geological Survey Report of Investigations 35 182-182
 R. E. Sloan and G. F. Webers. 1987. Stratigraphic ranges of Middle and Late Ordovician Gastropoda and Monoplacophora of Minnesota. In R. E. Sloan (ed.), Middle and Late Ordovician lithostratigraphy and biostratigraphy of the Upper Mississippi Valley: Minnesota Geological Survey Report of Investigations 35 183-186
 F. M. Swain. 1987. Middle and Upper Ordovician Ostracoda of Minnesota and Iowa. In R. E. Sloan (ed.), Minnesota Geological Survey Report of Investigations 35:99-101
 W. C. Parker. 1983. Fossil ecological successions in Paleozoic level bottom brachiopod-bryozoan communities. 1-217
 J. K. Rigby and T. N. Bayer. 1971. Sponges of the Ordovician Maquoketa Formation in Minnesota and Iowa. Journal of Paleontology 45(4):608-627
 A. K. Miller, W. Youngquist, and C. Collinson. 1954. Ordovician cephalopod fauna of Baffin Island. Geological Society of America Memoir 62:1-234
 Y. Wang. 1949. Maquoketa Brachiopoda of Iowa. Geological Society of America Memoir 42:1-55
 A. F. Foerste. 1924. Upper Ordovician faunas of Ontario and Quebec. Geological Survey of Canada Memoir 138(121):1-99

Geologic formations of Illinois
Geologic formations of Iowa
Geologic formations of Kansas
Geologic formations of Minnesota
Geologic formations of Missouri
Geologic formations of Wisconsin
Ordovician Illinois
Ordovician geology of Wisconsin
Dolomite formations
Limestone formations
Phosphorite formations
Shale formations
Deep marine deposits
Open marine deposits
Shallow marine deposits
Ordovician southern paleotemperate deposits
Paleontology in Illinois
Paleontology in Iowa
Paleontology in Minnesota